The 1999 Spanish regional elections were held on Sunday, 13 June 1999, to elect the regional parliaments of thirteen of the seventeen autonomous communities—Aragon, Asturias, the Balearic Islands, the Canary Islands, Cantabria, Castile and León, Castilla–La Mancha, Extremadura, La Rioja, Madrid, Murcia, Navarre and the Valencian Community, not including Andalusia, the Basque Country, Catalonia and Galicia, which had separate electoral cycles. 784 of 1,178 seats in the regional parliaments were up for election, as well as the 50 seats in the regional assemblies of Ceuta and Melilla. The elections were held simultaneously with local elections all throughout Spain, as well as the 1999 European Parliament election.

Election date
Determination of election day varied depending on the autonomous community, with each one having competency to establish its own regulations. Typically, thirteen out of the seventeen autonomous communities—all but Andalusia, the Basque Country, Catalonia and Galicia—had their elections fixed for the fourth Sunday of May every four years, to be held together with nationwide local elections. Legal amendments introduced in 1998 allowed for these elections to be held together with European Parliament elections, in the event that they were scheduled for within a four month-timespan.

In some cases, regional presidents had the prerogative to dissolve the regional parliament and call for extra elections at a different time, but newly elected assemblies were restricted to serving out what remained of their previous four-year terms without altering the period to their next ordinary election.

Regional governments
The following table lists party control in autonomous communities. Gains for a party are highlighted in that party's colour.

Overall results

Summary by region

Aragon

Asturias

Balearic Islands

Canary Islands

Cantabria

Castile and León

Castilla–La Mancha

Extremadura

La Rioja

Madrid

Murcia

Navarre

Valencian Community

Autonomous cities

Ceuta

Melilla

References

External links
www.juntaelectoralcentral.es (in Spanish). Central Electoral Commission – Regional elections
www.argos.gva.es (in Spanish). Argos Information Portal – Electoral Historical Archive
www.historiaelectoral.com (in Spanish and Catalan). Electoral History – Regional elections since 1980

1999